The 2008 African U-17 Women's Championship was the first edition of the African U-17 Cup of Nations for Women that served as the African qualifying tournament to the FIFA U-17 Women's World Cup.
The winners of the tournament Nigeria and the runners-up Ghana qualified to the 2008 FIFA U-17 Women's World Cup.

Preliminary round
Of six match pairings, only two were actually played out.

|}
1 Benin withdrew from competition before the start of the 1st leg. As a result, Liberia qualified for the next round.
2 Namibia withdrew from competition before the start of the 1st leg. As a result, Cameroon qualified for the next round.
3 Botswana withdrew from competition before the start of the 1st leg. As a result, South Africa qualified for the next round.
4 DR Congo withdrew from competition before the start of the 1st leg. As a result, Zimbabwe qualified for the next round.

First round

|}
1 Liberia withdrew from competition before the start of the 1st leg. As a result, Nigeria qualified for the next round.

Second round
In the second round a double-round robin was played. After that the top two teams, Nigeria and Ghana, qualified to the 2008 FIFA U-17 Women's World Cup.

References

External links
 Official website
 Tournament at RSSSF

African U-17 Cup of Nations for Women
CAF
Wom
2008 in youth sport
2008 in youth association football